Brigadier-General Wallace Duffield Wright,  (20 September 1875 – 25 March 1953) was a British soldier and politician. He was a recipient of the Victoria Cross, the highest award for gallantry in the face of the enemy that can be awarded to British and Commonwealth forces.

Early life
Wright, the son of James Sykes Wright was born in Gibraltar on 20 September 1875. He was educated at
Cranbrook School, Kent. He joined the Militia in 1893, and was commissioned into the 1st Battalion of the Queen's Royal Regiment (West Surrey) in December 1896.

Wright and served with the Malakand Field Force and the Tirah Expeditionary Force on the North West Frontier (1897–1898), during which he was severely wounded. He was awarded the Indian Frontier Medal with clasps for the Punjab Frontier and Tirah and was promoted to Lieutenant in September 1898.

Victoria Cross action
In 1901 Wright was sent to North Nigeria, where he was attached to the Northern Nigeria Regiment, during the West African Kano-Sokoto Expedition.

On 26 February 1903 in Nigeria, "Lieutenant Wright, with only one [other] Officer and 44 men took up a position in the path of the advancing enemy sustained the determined charges of 1,000 Horse and 2,000 Foot for two hours and when the enemy, after heavy losses, fell back in good order, Lieutenant Wright continued to follow them up until they were in full retreat.

The personal example of this Officer, as well as his skillful leadership, contributed largely to the brilliant success of the affair.

He in no way infringed his orders by his daring initiative, as, though warned of the possibility of meeting large bodies of the enemy, he had purposely been left a free hand."

As Member of Parliament
In 1928, Wright was elected at a by-election as Conservative Member of Parliament (MP) for Tavistock following the death of the sitting MP Philip Kenyon-Slaney. He was re-elected at the 1929 general election, but stood down at the 1931 general election.

His VC was destroyed in the fire at The Queen's Royal Surrey Regiment Museum, Clandon Park, Surrey on the afternoon of 29 April 2015.

Honours and awards

References

External links
 
Queen's Royal Surrey Regiment: Wallace Duffield Wright
Location of grave and VC medal (Brookwood Cemetery)
The Brookwood Cemetery Society (Known Holders of the Victoria Cross Commemorated in Brookwood Cemetery)

1875 births
1953 deaths
Conservative Party (UK) MPs for English constituencies
UK MPs 1924–1929
UK MPs 1929–1931
British Army generals
Companions of the Order of the Bath
Companions of the Order of St Michael and St George
Companions of the Distinguished Service Order
British recipients of the Victoria Cross
Burials at Brookwood Cemetery
Queen's Royal Regiment officers
British military personnel of the Malakand Frontier War
British military personnel of the Tirah campaign
British Army personnel of World War I
Royal West African Frontier Force officers
British Home Guard officers
Honourable Corps of Gentlemen at Arms
British military personnel of the Kano-Sokoto Expedition
Gibraltarians
British Army recipients of the Victoria Cross
People from colonial Nigeria
Members of the Parliament of the United Kingdom for Tavistock